Thalaimurai is a 1998 Indian Tamil-language film directed by Saravana Pandian and produced by M. K. Hari Shankar. The film stars director K. S. Adhiyaman in leading role along with Rajkiran, Kanaka, Bhanupriya, Revathi and Rajkapoor playing supporting roles. Revathi received Tamil Nadu State Film Award Special Prize for Best Actress. Adhiyaman, the lead actor of this film later directed Telugu remake of this film Bobbili Vamsam starring Dr. Rajasekhar.

Plot
Pandithurai (Raj Kiran) and Naachchiyaa (Revathi) are a respectable couple in the village. Naachchiyaa manages to conceive after 7 seven long years of marriage. She has a still born baby - Pandithurai replaces the dead baby with an illegitimate baby born to Panchavarnam (Bhanupriya) in the same hospital the same day, out of love for his wife, since he thinks that she would die if she hears that her baby was born dead. Raj Kapoor is the villain who is the father of this baby; Panchavarnam and Pandithurai promise each other that they wouldn't reveal this secret to anybody; but their conversation is overheard by Radha Ravi (Naachchiyaa's loving elder brother) and starts hating Muthu since he thinks he is an illegitimate child born to Panchavarnam and Pandithurai, but manages to keep it to himself out of fear of breaking up his sister's family. Panchavarnam joins the thurai household as domestic help. The son Muthu grows up to be an irresponsible but a very tender man (Adhiyaman), he is greatly hated by his uncle and the entire village. Radha Ravi's daughter (played by newcomer Lakshmi) and Muthu are in love and are supported by the entire family except Radha Ravi, who knows the secret of Muthu's parentage. He blurts the truth out to his sister in anger when she asks the reason for his opposition to their children's marital union. How the various characters involved (Pandithurai, Naachchiyaa, Muthu and Panchavarnam) come to terms with this new revelation, forms the rest of the story.

Cast
Rajkiran as Pandithurai
Revathi as Nachiyar
Bhanupriya as Panchavarnam
K. S. Adhiyaman as Muthuppandithurai "Muthu"
Kanaka
Vadivelu
Manobala
Raj Kapoor
Lakshmi

Production
Actress Lakshmi made her debut in the film under her original name. For her next ventures, including K. Rajan's Aval Paavam (2000), she changed her name to Ritika.

Soundtrack
The music was composed by Ilaiyaraaja and lyrics were written by Arivumathi, Then Mozhiyaan, Vasan and Nandalala.

References

External links
 

1998 films
Films scored by Ilaiyaraaja
1990s Tamil-language films
Indian drama films
Tamil films remade in other languages